This is a list of species within the chalcid genus Trichogramma

Trichogramma species

 Trichogramma acacioi Brun, Gomez de Moraes and Soares, 1984 
 Trichogramma acantholydae Pintureau and Kenis, 2000 
 Trichogramma achaeae Nagaraja and Nagarkatti, 1970 
 Trichogramma acuminatum Querino and Zucchi, 2003
 Trichogramma acutovirilia Pinto, 1999 
 Trichogramma adashkevitshi Sorokina, 1984 
 Trichogramma agriae Nagaraja, 1973 
 Trichogramma agrotidis Voegele and Pintureau, 1982 
 Trichogramma aldanense Sorokina, 1989 
 Trichogramma alloeovirilia Querino and Zucchi, 2003 
 Trichogramma alpha Pinto, 1999 
 Trichogramma aomoriense Honda, 2006 
 Trichogramma arcanum Pinto, 1999 
 Trichogramma artonae Chen and Pang, 1986 
 Trichogramma atopovirilia Oatman and Platner, 1983 
 Trichogramma atropos Pinto, 1992 
 Trichogramma aurosum Sugonjaev and Sorokina, 1976 
 Trichogramma australicum Girault, 1912 
 Trichogramma bactrianum Sugonjaev and Sorokina, 1976 
 Trichogramma ballmeri Pinto, 1999 
 Trichogramma bellaunionense Basso and Pintureau, 2001 
 Trichogramma bennetti Nagaraja and Nagarkatti, 1973 
 Trichogramma bertii Zucchi and Querino, 2003
 Trichogramma bezdencovii Bezdenko, 1968 
 Trichogramma bilingense He and Pang, 2000 
 Trichogramma bispinosum Pinto, 1999 
 Trichogramma bistrae (Kostadinov, 1988) 
 Trichogramma bourarachae Pintureau and Babault, 1988 
 Trichogramma bournieri Pintureau and Babault, 1988 
 Trichogramma brassicae Bezdenko, 1968 
 Trichogramma brevicapillum Pinto and Platner, 1978 
 Trichogramma breviciliata Yousuf and Hassan, 2007 
 Trichogramma breviflagellata Yousuf (unavailable name in current taxon) 
 Trichogramma brevifringiata Yousuf and Shafee, 1988 
 Trichogramma browningi Pinto and Oatman, 1985 
 Trichogramma bruni Nagaraja, 1983 
 Trichogramma buesi Voegele, 1985 
 Trichogramma buluti Bulut and Kilincer, 1991 
 Trichogramma cacaeciae Marchal, 1927 
 Trichogramma cacaeciae Marchal, 1927 (unavailable name in current taxon) 
 Trichogramma californicum Nagaraja and Nagarkatti, 1973 
 Trichogramma canadense Pinto, 1999 
 Trichogramma canariense del Pino and Polaszek, 2013 
 Trichogramma carina Walker, 1843 
 Trichogramma carverae Oatman and Pinto, 1987 
 Trichogramma castrense Velasquez de Rios and Teran, 1995 
 Trichogramma cephalciae Hochmut and Martinek, 1963 
 Trichogramma chilonis Ishii, 1941 
 Trichogramma chilotraeae Nagaraja and Nagarkatti, 1970 
 Trichogramma choui Chan and Chou, 2000 
 Trichogramma chusniddini Sorokina and Atamirzaeva, 1993 
 Trichogramma closterae Pang and Chen, 1974 
 Trichogramma clotho Pinto, 1992 
 Trichogramma colombiense Velasquez de Rios and Teran, 1995 
 Trichogramma convolvuli Nagaraja, 2008 
 Trichogramma cordubense Vargas and Cabello, 1985 
 Trichogramma cultellus Jose, Hirose and Honda, 2005 
 Trichogramma cuttackense Nagaraja, 2008 
 Trichogramma danaidiphagum Nagaraja and Prasanth, 2010 
 Trichogramma danausicida Nagaraja, 2008 
 Trichogramma danubiense Birova and Kazimirova, 1997 
 Trichogramma daumalae Dugast and Voegele, 1984 
 Trichogramma deion Pinto and Oatman, 1986 
 Trichogramma demoraesi Nagaraja, 1983 
 Trichogramma dendrolimi Matsumura, 1926 
 Trichogramma dianae Pinto, 1999 
 Trichogramma diazi Velasquez de Rios and Teran, 2003 
 Trichogramma dissimile Zucchi, 1988 
 Trichogramma distinctum Zucchi, 1988 
 Trichogramma drepanophorum Pinto and Oatman, 1985 
 Trichogramma elegantum Sorokina, 1984 
 Trichogramma embryophagum (Hartig, 1838) 
 Trichogramma erebus Pinto, 1999 
 Trichogramma erosicorne Westwood, 1879 
 Trichogramma esalqueanum Querino and Zucchi, 2003 
 Trichogramma ethiopicum (Risbec, 1956) 
 Trichogramma euproctidis (Girault, 1911) 
 Trichogramma evanescens Westwood, 1833 
 Trichogramma exiguum Pinto and Platner, 1978 
 Trichogramma falx Pinto and Oatman, 1996 
 Trichogramma fasciatum (Perkins, 1912) 
 Trichogramma flandersi Nagaraja and Nagarkatti, 1970 
 Trichogramma flavum Ashmead, 1880 
 Trichogramma forcipiforme Zhang and Wang, 1982 
 Trichogramma fuentesi Torre, 1980 
 Trichogramma funestum Pinto and Oatman, 1989 
 Trichogramma funiculatum Carver, 1978 
 Trichogramma fuzhouense Lin, 1994 
 Trichogramma gabrielino Pinto, 1999 
 Trichogramma galloi Zucchi, 1988 
 Trichogramma georgia (unavailable name in current taxon)
 Trichogramma gicai Pintureau and Stefanescu, 2000 
 Trichogramma gordhi Pinto, 1999 
 Trichogramma guariquense Velasquez de Rios and Teran, 1995 
 Trichogramma guineense (unavailable name in current taxon) 
 Trichogramma hebbalensis Nagaraja, 2008 
 Trichogramma hesperidis Nagaraja, 1973 
 Trichogramma higai Oatman and Platner, 1982 
 Trichogramma huberi Pinto, 1999 
 Trichogramma infelix Pinto, 1999 
 Trichogramma ingricum Sorokina, 1984 
 Trichogramma interius Pinto, 1999 
 Trichogramma inyoense Pinto and Oatman, 1985 
 Trichogramma iracildae Querino and Zucchi, 2003 
 Trichogramma itsybitsi Pinto and Stouthamer, 2002 
 Trichogramma ivelae Pang and Chen, 1974 
 Trichogramma jalmirezi Zucchi, 1988 
 Trichogramma japonicum Ashmead, 1904 
 Trichogramma jaxarticum Sorokina, 1984 
 Trichogramma jezoense Ishii, 1941 
 Trichogramma julianoi Platner and Oatman, 1981 
 Trichogramma kalkae Schulten and Feijen, 1978 
 Trichogramma kankerense Yousuf and Hassan, 2008 
 Trichogramma kashmiricum Nagaraja, Ahmad and Gupta, 2007 
 Trichogramma kaykai Pinto and Stouthamer, 1997 
 Trichogramma kilinceri Bulut and Kilincer, 1991 
 Trichogramma koehleri Blanchard, 1927 
 Trichogramma kurosuae Taylor, Yashiro, Hirose and Honda, 2005 
 Trichogramma lachesis Pinto, 1992 
 Trichogramma lacustre Sorokina, 1978 
 Trichogramma lasallei Pinto, 1999 
 Trichogramma latipenne Yousuf and Hasan, 2008 
 Trichogramma lenae Sorokina, 1991 
 Trichogramma leptoparameron Dyurich, 1987 
 Trichogramma leucaniae Pang and Chen, 1974 
 Trichogramma leviculum Pinto, 1999 
 Trichogramma lingulatum Pang and Chen, 1974 
 Trichogramma longxishanense Lin, 1994 
 Trichogramma lopezandinense Sarmiento, 1993 
 Trichogramma maltbyi Nagaraja and Nagarkatti, 1973 
 Trichogramma mandelai Pintureau and Babault, 1988 
 Trichogramma manicobai Brun, Gomez de Moraes and Soares, 1984 
 Trichogramma manii Nagaraja and Gupta, 2007 
 Trichogramma maori Pinto and Oatman, 1996 
 Trichogramma marandobai Brun, Gomez de Moraes and Soares, 1986 
 Trichogramma margianum Sorokina, 1984 
 Trichogramma marthae Goodpasture, 1986 
 Trichogramma marylandense Thorpe, 1982 
 Trichogramma maxacalii Voegele and Pointel, 1980 
 Trichogramma meteorum Vincent, 1986 
 Trichogramma minutum Riley, 1871 
 Trichogramma mirabile Dyurich, 1987 
 Trichogramma mirum Girault, 1922 
 Trichogramma misiae Kostadinov, 1987 
 Trichogramma mullensi Pinto, 1999 
 Trichogramma mwanzai Schulten and Feijen, 1982 
 Trichogramma nemesis Pinto, 1999 
 Trichogramma nerudai Pintureau and Gerding, 1999 
 Trichogramma nestoris (Kostadinov, 1991) 
 Trichogramma neuropterae Chan and Chou, 1996 
 Trichogramma niveiscapus (Morley, 1950) 
 Trichogramma nomlaki Pinto and Oatman, 1985 
 Trichogramma nubilale Ertle and Davis, 1975 
 Trichogramma oatmani Torre, 1980 
 Trichogramma obscurum Pinto, 1999 
 Trichogramma offella Pinto and Oatman, 1985 
 Trichogramma okinawae Honda, 2006 
 Trichogramma oleae Voegele and Pointel, 1979
 Trichogramma ostriniae Pang and Chen, 1974 
 Trichogramma pallidiventris Nagaraja, 1973 
 Trichogramma panamense Pinto, 1999 
 Trichogramma pangi Lin, 1987 
 Trichogramma papilionidis Viggiani, 1972 
 Trichogramma papilionis Nagarkatti, 1974 
 Trichogramma paraplasseyensis Yousuf (unavailable name in current taxon) 
 Trichogramma parkeri Nagarkatti, 1975 
 Trichogramma parnarae Huo, 1986 
 Trichogramma parrai Querino and Zucchi, 2003 
 Trichogramma parvum Pinto, 1999 
 Trichogramma pelovi Kostadinov, 1986 
 Trichogramma perkinsi Girault, 1912 
 Trichogramma piceum Dyurich, 1987 
 Trichogramma pinneyi Schulten and Feijen, 1978 
 Trichogramma pintoi Voegele, 1982 
 Trichogramma pintureaui Rodriguez and Galan, 1993 
 Trichogramma piracicabense Querino and Zucchi, 2017 
 Trichogramma pkcal (unavailable name in current taxon) 
 Trichogramma plasseyense Nagaraja, 1973 
 Trichogramma platneri Nagarkatti, 1975 
 Trichogramma pluto Pinto, 1999 
 Trichogramma poliae Nagaraja, 1973 
 Trichogramma polychrosis Chen and Pang, 1981 
 Trichogramma pratissolii Querino and Zucchi, 2003 
 Trichogramma pratti Pinto, 1999 
 Trichogramma pretiosum Riley, 1879 
 Trichogramma primaevum Pinto, 1992 
 Trichogramma principium Sugonjaev and Sorokina, 1976 
 Trichogramma psocopterae Chan and Chou, 1996 
 Trichogramma pusillum Querino and Zucchi, 2003 
 Trichogramma raoi Nagaraja, 1973 
 Trichogramma retorridum (Girault, 1911) 
 Trichogramma rojasi Nagaraja and Nagarkatti, 1973 
 Trichogramma rossicum Sorokina, 1984 
 Trichogramma sankarani Nagaraja, 2008 
 Trichogramma santarosae Pinto, 1999 
 Trichogramma sathon Pinto, 1999 
 Trichogramma savalense Sorokina, 1991 
 Trichogramma schaposchnikovi Meyer (unavailable name in current taxon) 
 Trichogramma sembeli Oatman and Platner, 1982 
 Trichogramma semblidis (Aurivillius, 1898) 
 Trichogramma semifumatum (Perkins, 1910) 
 Trichogramma semifusca Blanchard (unavailable name in current taxon) 
 Trichogramma sericini Pang and Chen, 1974 
 Trichogramma shaanxiense Huo, 1991 
 Trichogramma shchepetilnikovae Sorokina, 1984 
 Trichogramma sibiricum Sorokina, 1980 
 Trichogramma siddiqi Nasir and Schoeller, 2011 
 Trichogramma silvestre Sorokina, 1984
 Trichogramma singularis Girault, 1932 
 Trichogramma sinuosum Pinto, 1999 
 Trichogramma sogdianum Sorokina, 1984 
 Trichogramma sorokinae Kostadinov, 1986 
 Trichogramma stampae Vincent, 1986
 Trichogramma sugonjaevi Sorokina, 1984 
 Trichogramma suorangelica Pinto, 1999 
 Trichogramma taiwanense Chan and Chou, 2000 
 Trichogramma tajimaense Yashiro, Hirose and Honda, 2012 
 Trichogramma talitzkii Dyurich, 1987 
 Trichogramma tenebrosum Oatman and Pinto, 1987 
 Trichogramma terani Velasquez de Rios and Teran, 2003 
 Trichogramma thalense Pinto and Oatman, 1985 
 Trichogramma tielingense Zhang and Wang, 1982 
 Trichogramma trjapitzini Sorokina, 1984 
 Trichogramma tshumakovae Sorokina, 1984 
 Trichogramma tupiense Querino and Zucchi, 2003 
 Trichogramma turkeiense Bulut and Kilincer, 1991 
 Trichogramma turkestanicum Meyer, 1940 
 Trichogramma umerus Jose, Hirose and Honda, 2005 
 Trichogramma urquijoi Cabello Garcia, 1986 
 Trichogramma ussuricum Sorokina, 1984 
 Trichogramma valentinei Pinto and Oatman, 1996 
 Trichogramma valmiri Querino and Zucchi, 2017 
 Trichogramma vargasi Oatman and Platner, 1982 
 Trichogramma viggianii Pinto, 1999 
 Trichogramma yabui Honda and Taylor, 2006 
 Trichogramma yawarae Hirai and Fursov, 1998 
 Trichogramma zahiri Polaszek, 2002 
 Trichogramma zeirapherae Walter, 1985 
 Trichogramma zeta Pinto, 1999 
 Trichogramma zucchii Querino, 2003

References

Trichogrammatidae
Hymenoptera genera
Lists of insect species